Antonio Gasalla (born March 9, 1941) is an Argentine actor, comedian, and theatre director.

Life and work
Antonio Gasalla was born in Ramos Mejía, a western suburb of Buenos Aires, in 1941. He enrolled at the National Dramatic Arts Conservatory, and began his work in Buenos Aires' vibrant theatre scene in 1964 as an understudy, by which he befriended a colleague, Uruguayan émigré Carlos Perciavalle. He and Perciavalle starred in their production of María Inés Quesada's Help Valentino! (1966), which they performed as a café-concert; this genre was popular in Argentina at the time, and the Gasalla-Perciavalle duo became among its best known exponents.

They accepted roles in film productions of Un viaje de locos (Madmen's Journey) and Clínica con música (Musical Clinic) in 1974. Though known for their comedy roles, they were also cast in 1974 by Sergio Renán for La tregua (The Truce), the first Argentine film nominated for an Oscar for Best Foreign Language Film. The duo parted ways subsequently, and Gasalla was cast in a comic role in Tiro al aire (Shot in the Dark), a 1980 family film starring Héctor Alterio.

Offbeat film director Alejandro Doria offered Gasalla the lead role in a 1985 comedy, Esperando la carroza (Waiting for the Hearse). Portraying Mamá Cora, a mischievous nonagenarian in need of attention from her self-absorbed family, Gasalla underwent four hours of prosthetic and makeup work daily, while shooting lasted. Receiving mixed reviews, the grotesque comedy was a commercial success and introduced Gasalla to a new act: female impersonation.

He appeared seldom on television work until 1990, when he was offered a comedy show, El Mundo de Gasalla (Gasalla's World), following which he hosted or starred in numerous other variety programs on Argentine television, mostly for Channel 9. The most popular of these was El palacio de la risa (The Palace of Laughter), where television audiences became acquainted with his feminine roles. His comic portrayals earned his first Martín Fierro Award, the most prestigious in Argentine entertainment, in 1994.

Having had a falling out twenty years earlier, Gasalla and his erstwhile café-concert partner, Carlos Perciavalle, were reunited in a 1997-98 theatrical series in Punta del Este, Uruguay. Gasalla then returned to film in 2000, portraying Fredy, a homosexual man, in Almejas y mejillones (Clams and Mussels), and to the theatre, where he portrayed his numerous female characters from 2000 to 2004.

Ending his hiatus from television in 2004, he hosted Gasalla en pantalla (Gasalla on the Screen) and portrayed "grandma," an irreverent elderly woman, for Susana Giménez's popular variety show. This role earned him another Martín Fierro Prize. Collaborating in homages to the late comedian Niní Marshall in 2005 and for the Maipo Theatre's centennial in 2008, he also portrayed Argentine President Cristina Kirchner in Nito Artaza's Cristina en el país de las maravillas (Cristina in Wonderland). Gasalla more recently directed Hernán Casciari's Más respeto que soy tu madre (More Respect - I'm Your Mother), playing the title role, as well.

Gasalla remains among the most successful Argentine theatre and television personalities. Following a May 4, 2009, guest appearance in Marcelo Tinelli's Showmatch (as Olga, the opinionated make-up lady), the popular variety show's ratings reportedly jumped to some of the highest in local television history. His success on the stage earned him a standing as the "king of Corrientes Avenue."

Female impersonation

Gasalla's female impersonations remain the hallmark of his career not only for his intricate portrayals, but also for their sheer number. Some of the best-known over the years have included:

 Grandma/Mamá Cora: a senile, though willful, nonagenarian.
 Soledad Solari: a woman with multiple phobias.
 Inesita: a high-society maven frequently under her plastic surgeon's knife (often with disastrous consequences).
 Yolanda: an elderly, hypochondriac woman psychologically attached to her wheelchair.
 Bárbara: a parody of television hosts Rona Barrett or Barbara Walters.
 Noelia: an overdressed, eccentric schoolteacher.
 Flora: an inflexible, petty public servant (roughly equivalent to Lily Tomlin's Ernestine the operator).
 The Nurse: a health worker who loses more patients than she saves.
 Mirta Bertotti: the middle-aged matriarch of a dysfunctional family.
 Esther Estrés: Estrés translates as "stress" in Spanish.
 Dr. Gutman: an indiscreet psychoanalyst.

References

External links

1941 births
Living people
People from Ramos Mejía
Argentine people of Italian descent
Argentine male actors
Argentine male comedians
Argentine theatre directors
Argentine television personalities
Golden Martín Fierro Award winners
Argentine LGBT actors
LGBT theatre directors
21st-century Argentine LGBT people
Bailando por un Sueño (Argentine TV series) judges